Kind is a surname. Notable people with the surname include:

 Adolfo Kind (1848–1907), Swiss chemical engineer and one of the fathers of Italian skiing
 Johann Friedrich Kind (1768–1843), German dramatist
 Paolo Kind, Italian ski jumper, son of Adolfo Kind
 Richard Kind (born 1956), American actor
 Ron Kind (born 1963), U.S. Representative from Wisconsin